Cesare Calense (died 1640) was a native of the province of Lecce in the kingdom of Naples, Italy. He painted a Deposition for the church of St John the Baptist in Naples.

References

People from Lecce
16th-century Italian painters
Italian male painters
Renaissance painters
Painters from Naples
Year of death unknown
Year of birth unknown